This list of mountains in Ponce, Puerto Rico, consists of both hills, mountains, and similarly named geographic features with a summit in the municipality of Ponce, Puerto Rico.

Mountain list summary table

Gallery

See also

 List of islands of Ponce, Puerto Rico

References

External links

History of Puerto Rico
 
Mountains
mountains